1992 presidential election may refer to:

 1992 Angolan presidential election
 1992 Austrian presidential election
 1992 Azerbaijani presidential election
 1992 Bulgarian presidential election
 1992 Cameroonian presidential election
 1992 Croatian presidential election
 1992 Estonian presidential election
 1992 Ghanaian presidential election
 1992 Icelandic presidential election
 1992 Indian presidential election
 1992 Italian presidential election
 1992 Kurdistan Region presidential election
 1992 Kenyan presidential election
 1992–93 Malagasy presidential election
 1992 Malian presidential election
 1992 Mauritanian presidential election
 1992 Philippine presidential election
 1992 Republic of the Congo presidential election
 1992 Slovenian presidential election
 1992 South Korean presidential election
 1992 Turkmenistani presidential election
 1992 United States presidential election